Onuray Köse (born 11 February 1996) is a Finnish football player who plays as midfielder for  Reipas.

Personal life
Köse's older brother Ibrahim is a former footballer.

References

External links
 
 

Living people
1996 births
Sportspeople from Lahti
Finnish footballers
Association football midfielders
Mikkelin Palloilijat players
FC Lahti players
FC Kuusysi players
Darıca Gençlerbirliği footballers
Veikkausliiga players
Kakkonen players
Ykkönen players
TFF Third League players